Magnolia changhungtana is a species of flowering plant named by Hans Peter Nooteboom in 2008. It is native to China.

References

changhungtana
Flora of China